The Infanticide Act (Northern Ireland) 1939 (c 5) (NI) is an Act of the Parliament of Northern Ireland. It makes similar provision to the Infanticide Act 1938 for Northern Ireland.

Section 1 – Offence of infanticide
Sections 1(1) and (2) are amended, with effect from 1 June 2011, by section 58 of the Coroners and Justice Act 2009.

The words "or a verdict of not guilty on the ground of insanity" in section 1(3) were substituted by Mental Health (Northern Ireland) Order 1986 (SI 1986/595) (NI 4).

Section 1(4) was repealed by the Criminal Law Act (Northern Ireland) 1967 (c 18) (NI).

Section 2 – Short title
Section 2(2) was repealed by Statute Law Revision Act (Northern Ireland) 1952.

Section 2(3) was repealed by the Interpretation Act (Northern Ireland) 1954 (c 33) (NI).

See also
Infanticide Act

References

External links

The Infanticide Act (Northern Ireland) 1939, as amended from the National Archives.

Acts of the Parliament of Northern Ireland 1939
Infanticide